Terpsichori Chryssoulaki-Vlachou,, born in Sitia,, was a Greek female radio operator working for the Greek resistance during World War II. She was executed by the Nazis when caught.

Biography

Born in 1926 on the island of Crete, Greece, Terpsichori was one of the many Cretan women who responded eagerly and passionately to the national call by the Greek government to fight Nazi occupation of Greece during World War II. Hidden in the monastery of Toplou,, her experience as a wireless operator helped the resistance movement.

In June 1944 she was arrested and sentenced to death.  At age 18, she was taken to Agia Jail and executed, but before her execution, she wrote on the wall of her jail cell, "I am 18 years old and sentenced to death. I am waiting for the firing squad any minute now. Long live Greece. Long live Crete!". (Greek: "Είμαι 18 χρονών. Με καταδίκασαν σε θάνατο. Περιμένω από στιγμή σε στιγμή το εκτελεστικό απόσπασμα. Ζήτω η Ελλάδα. Ζήτω η Κρήτη!".)

Sources

External links
Preveli Monastery - in Greek

1926 births
1944 deaths
People from Sitia
Female resistance members of World War II
Greek Resistance members
Executed Greek people
Executed Greek women
Greek people executed by Nazi Germany
Resistance members killed by Nazi Germany
Cretan Resistance
People executed by Greece by firing squad
Cretan women
20th-century Greek people